Oreino (local Slavic: Јурен Дере, Орен Дере) is a former village, now in ruins, in Kavala regional unit, Greece. During the population exchange between Greece and Turkey in the early 1920s, the population, primarily Turks with some Slavs, were forced to leave their homes and the village was not repopulated. There is a large stone wall that still lyes there after a war that occurred in 1500 ad and that village had started that war

References

Ruins in Greece
Kavala (regional unit)
Buildings and structures in Eastern Macedonia and Thrace